Santee may refer to:

People
 Santee Dakota, a subgroup of the Dakota people, of the U.S. Great Plains
 Santee (South Carolina), a Native American people of South Carolina

Places
 Lake Santee, Indiana, a reservoir and census-designated place
 Santee, California
 Santee (Corbin, Virginia), a historic plantation home
 Santee Indian Reservation in Nebraska
 Santee, Nebraska
 Santee, South Carolina
 Santee River in South Carolina

Other uses
 Santee (surname)
 Santee Education Complex, Los Angeles, California
 Santee (film), a 1973 western starring Glenn Ford
 Santee (plumbing), a tee joint in a sanitation line
 USS Santee, multiple ships of the United States Navy